Edinaldo Gomes Pereira (born 28 August 1988), known as Naldo, is a Brazilian professional footballer who plays as a central defender for Saudi Arabian club Al-Taawoun.

Club career
Born in Santo André, São Paulo, Naldo played for Cascavel CR, CA Linense and Oeste FC before moving to União São João EC for the 2010 season, with his rights being owned by Traffic Group. In April 2010 he moved to Série B's AA Ponte Preta.

Naldo made his professional debut on 7 May 2010, coming on as a late substitute in a 1–1 away draw against ASA de Arapiraca. He scored his first goal on 3 September, netting the last in a 3–1 win at América Mineiro.

On 29 December 2010, Naldo moved to Cruzeiro EC, in Série A. After featuring regularly for the club he moved to fellow league team Grêmio FBPA on 9 January 2012.

On 29 January 2013, Naldo signed a five-year deal with Granada CF, being immediately loaned to Serie A's Bologna F.C. 1909. He made his debut in the competition on 10 March, playing the entire second half in a 1–0 away win against Inter Milan.

In May 2013, after making five appearances for Bologna, Naldo was assigned to Granada's partner club Udinese Calcio. A backup to countryman Danilo and Thomas Heurtaux, he appeared in 16 matches during the campaign.

On 1 September 2014, Naldo was loaned to La Liga side Getafe CF, in a season-long deal. He made his debut in the competition on the 14th, starting in a 0–2 away loss against Sevilla FC.

On 18 July 2015, Naldo signed for Portuguese side Sporting CP, but moved to Russian club FC Krasnodar on 26 August of the following year. On 10 August 2017, Krasnodar confirmed his transfer to RCD Espanyol.

On 25 July 2022, Naldo joined Saudi Arabian club Al-Taawoun on a free transfer.

Honours
Sporting CP
Supertaça Cândido de Oliveira: 2015

References

External links

1988 births
Living people
People from Santo André, São Paulo
Brazilian footballers
Association football defenders
Campeonato Brasileiro Série A players
Campeonato Brasileiro Série B players
Serie A players
La Liga players
Primeira Liga players
Russian Premier League players
Saudi Professional League players
Clube Atlético Linense players
Oeste Futebol Clube players
Associação Atlética Ponte Preta players
Cruzeiro Esporte Clube players
Grêmio Foot-Ball Porto Alegrense players
Bologna F.C. 1909 players
Udinese Calcio players
Getafe CF footballers
Sporting CP footballers
FC Krasnodar players
Al-Taawoun FC players
Brazilian expatriate footballers
Expatriate footballers in Italy
Brazilian expatriate sportspeople in Italy
Expatriate footballers in Spain
Brazilian expatriate sportspeople in Spain
Expatriate footballers in Portugal
Expatriate footballers in Russia
Expatriate footballers in Saudi Arabia
Brazilian expatriate sportspeople in Saudi Arabia
Footballers from São Paulo (state)